Theodosia Inlet is an inlet in the Desolation Sound region of the South Coast region of British Columbia, Canada, located east of Lancelot Inlet, a sub-inlet of Malaspina Inlet.  The inlet is fed by the Theodosia River.  The locality of Theodosia Arm is located near its outlet at the head of Thors Cove.

See also
Theodosia (disambiguation)

References

New Westminster Land District
Sunshine Coast (British Columbia)
Inlets of British Columbia